Red Carpet is a package management system for Linux kernel-based operating system that was developed as part of the Ximian desktop. Ximian and therefore Red Carpet is now owned by Novell.
Red Carpet supports most of the popular Linux distributions and maintains their software installation through the RPM package database. The name Red Carpet has officially disappeared and the software renamed to ZENworks Linux Management, to match Novell's existing software distribution platform.

See also
 PackageKit

External links 
 Official ZENworks Linux Management product page

Linux package management-related software

he:שטיח אדום